Drunk or Dead is a first-person shooter video game for virtual reality by 4 I Lab. Initially released in January, 2017.

Plot 
The game takes place during apocalypse caused by a virus that turns all sober people into zombies. The virus has only one weakness — it is unstable toward alcohol and infects only those organisms which have no blood alcohol content.

The player starts in a room that keeps a great amount of different of alcoholic beverages and weapons — a Wild West bar.

Gameplay 
The game's main objective is to keep the levels of alcohol in the player character's system as high as possible without getting poisoned. Any bite received from a zombie lowers the amount of alcohol in their system. The higher the levels of alcohol, the more health points the player has, but drinking too much will add a woozy effect and make the character sway around. The lower the amount of alcohol, the less health points, however, the player see more clearly, thus making it easier to aim.

Development 
The game was created in 36 hours, during a Christmas non-stop hackathon by 4 I Lab  studio. The game was published on Steam on January 10, 2017, with HTC Vive support. On April 5, 2017, support for the Oculus Rift and Touch controllers was added.

Reception 
The game was positively reviewed by Rock, Paper, Shotgun, UploadVR and pocketgamer.co.uk.

References 

First-person shooters
2017 video games
Video game gameplay
Single-player video games